NorBrock Stadium is a professional-sized baseball field located at the McArthur Island Park in Kamloops, British Columbia, in Canada.  It was built as a 1967 Canada Centennial project and seats approximately 1,500 spectators.

It hosts the annual Kamloops International Ball Tournament, which involves both Canadian and American teams, every July.

In 2021, the Kamloops Northpaws will play collegiate summer baseball at Norbrock Stadium in the West Coast League.

References

1967 establishments in British Columbia
Baseball venues in British Columbia
Sports venues completed in 1967
Sports venues in Kamloops